ESPN MLS GameNight is a video game of the sports genre released in 2000 by Konami and Saffire. The game is considered to be an enhanced remake of ISS Pro Evolution, also published by Konami. It is the only MLS game to have been released on the PlayStation other than FIFA 2000. The sequel, ESPN MLS ExtraTime 2002, was released for PlayStation 2 in 2001, and for GameCube and Xbox in 2002.

The game also featured the option of choosing either English commentary (provided by Bob Ley) or Spanish commentary (provided by Luis Omar Tapia).

Gameplay
It has the option of choosing either 12 teams from the MLS or 53 international teams for a quick, friendly Exhibition game. In Season Mode, the player participates in a full 32-game Major League Soccer season where they are tasked with having to deal with realistic injuries, unpredictable weather conditions, and mid-season trades.

There's also a Custom League mode and a custom-player option that lets the player build up to 22 original players.

Reception

The game received "average" reviews according to the review aggregation website Metacritic. Game Informer gave it a favorable review, nearly two months before the game's release.

References

External links
 

2000 video games
Association football video games
ESPN video games
Konami games
Major League Soccer
North America-exclusive video games
PlayStation (console) games
PlayStation (console)-only games
Saffire games
Video games developed in the United States
Video games scored by Akira Yamaoka
Video games set in the United States
Video games developed in Japan